Łódź Ring Road (Obwodnica Łodzi in Polish) is a common name to the complex of motorways (A1 and A2) and expressways (S8 and S14) in Poland, being built in order to decrease the traffic in the city of Łódź and neighbouring regions of Zgierz, Pabianice and Rzgów.

Sections

Eastern section: A1 

It has been opened on July 1, 2016.

Junctions

Northern section: A2 

The section between Emilia and Stryków junctions has been opened on July 26, 2006. Following section between Stryków and Łódź Północ junctions has been opened on December 22, 2008.

Junctions

Southern section: S8 

The first section between Róża and Rzgów has been opened on April 11, 2014. The second section between Rzgów and Łódź Południe junction has been opened on July 1, 2016.

Junctions

Western section: S14 

The first section between Dobroń and Łódź Lublinek junctions was opened on May 16, 2012 ( long section between planned Łódź Lublinek junction and Szynkielew III temporary junction, along with a section of DK14 national road between Pabianicka St. in Łódź and Łódź Lublinek junction) and July 13, 2012 (following Dobroń - Szynkielew III section). The second section, between Róża and Dobroń junctions, has been opened on April 11, 2014. The construction of third section, between Emilia and Łódź Lublinek junctions, has begun in 2019 and is expected to end in 2022.

Junctions

References 

Roads in Poland
Proposed roads in Poland
Transport in Łódź